The 1874 Newcastle-upon-Tyne by-election was fought on 14 January 1874.  The byelection was fought due to the death of the incumbent MP of the Liberal Party, Joseph Cowen.  It was won by his son, the Liberal candidate Joseph Cowen.

References

1874 elections in the United Kingdom
1874 in England
Elections in Newcastle upon Tyne
By-elections to the Parliament of the United Kingdom in Northumberland constituencies
19th century in Newcastle upon Tyne
19th century in Northumberland